ISO 3166-2:BH is the entry for Bahrain in ISO 3166-2, part of the ISO 3166 standard published by the International Organization for Standardization (ISO), which defines codes for the names of the principal subdivisions (e.g., provinces or states) of all countries coded in ISO 3166-1.

Currently for Bahrain, ISO 3166-2 codes are defined for 4 governorates. Each code consists of two parts, separated by a hyphen. The second part is two digits (13–17, with the exception of 16, which was assigned to Al Wusţá before its abolition in 2014).

Current codes
Subdivision names are listed as in the ISO 3166-2 standard published by the ISO 3166 Maintenance Agency (ISO 3166/MA).

Click on the button in the header to sort each column.

Notes

Changes
The following changes to the entry have been announced in newsletters by the ISO 3166/MA since the first publication of ISO 3166-2 in 1998. ISO stopped issuing newsletters in 2013.

The following changes to the entry are listed on ISO's online catalogue, the Online Browsing Platform:

Codes before Newsletter I-8

See also
 Subdivisions of Bahrain
 FIPS region codes of Bahrain

External links
 ISO Online Browsing Platform: BH
 Governorates of Bahrain, Statoids.com

2:BH
ISO 3166-2
Bahrain geography-related lists